Super Junior Full House is a reality television series broadcast from May 27, 2006, to August 26, 2006. The show was a 25-minute comedy that aired every Saturday during the airtimes of SBS Realtime, after the airing of Love Letter. The show presents comedic experiences between the South Korean boy band Super Junior and two female international students, who did a homestay with Super Junior for a month.

Background
Two female international students - Anya, a 20-year-old half-Russian half-Polish intern, and Eva, a 25-year-old half-Japanese half-English of Polish descent intern - arrive in Seoul, South Korea to do a home stay with half the members of Super Junior. While living with Super Junior, the two foreign students experience comedic adventures with the group and develop deep friendships. A comedy, these thirteen episodes center mostly around Super Junior learning English.

Although all members are seen throughout the show, it mainly features members Heechul, Eunhyuk, Hankyung, Kangin, Donghae, Siwon, and Kibum.

See also
 Super Junior
 Seoul Broadcasting System

References

External links
  SBS Realtime
  SBS Introduction
  SBS Board

Seoul Broadcasting System original programming
South Korean reality television series
Super Junior television series
2006 South Korean television series debuts
2006 South Korean television series endings